Agnellus is a proper name of Latin origin. It may refer to:

Agnellus of Naples, bishop of Naples from 673–ca. 694, and patron saint of Naples
Agnellus, Bishop of Ravenna (487–570), a bishop of Ravenna
Andreas Agnellus (c. 805–c. 846), historian of Ravenna
Agnellus of Pisa (1195–1236), English Franciscan 
Agnellus, martyred in 1227 at Ceuta with Daniel and Companions

Masculine given names